Artanna is an unincorporated community in Knox County, in the U.S. state of Ohio.

History
The community's name is an amalgamation of Arthur "Art" and Anna Wolfe, the proprietors of a local gas station that opened in the early 1930s. For a time the community hosted cabins for travelers, owned by the same couple.

References

Unincorporated communities in Knox County, Ohio
Unincorporated communities in Ohio